The Best Yet - Live is a live DVD featuring the American rock band, Switchfoot. It was recorded live at the Sommet Center in Nashville, Tennessee, on September 21, 2008, during the band's co-headlined Music Builds Tour.

The title of the film appears to coincide with the band's greatest hits album of the same name. 
A CD with just the audio of the concert was available to members of Friends of the Foot, once the previous Friends of the Foot exclusive Best of Bootlegs Vol. 1 was out of print.

Track listing
 Stars
 Oh! Gravity.
 Gone
 We Are One Tonight / Shadow Proves The Sunshine
 This Is Home
 This Is Your Life
 American Dream
 Dirty Second Hands
 On Fire
 Awakening
 Meant to Live
 Dare You to Move

References

2009 live albums
2009 video albums
Live video albums
Switchfoot live albums
Christian live video albums